Jacob Mauney Cooper is an American composer living in Philadelphia, Pennsylvania.

Biography
After attending Amherst College for his bachelor's degree in both geology and music, Cooper completed his graduate studies in composition at the Yale School of Music, and later formed the composers’ collective Sleeping Giant with several of his classmates. His works have been performed by the Calder Quartet, JACK Quartet, Eighth Blackbird, Minnesota Orchestra, Albany Symphony Orchestra, Ensemble ACJW, NOW Ensemble, Dither Quartet, Living Earth Show, Carmina Slovenica, Mellissa Hughes, Timo Andres, Theo Bleckmann, Jodie Landau, Ashley Bathgate, and Vicky Chow.

Cooper's national awards include a Music Alive Residency Award from New Music USA, a Charles Ives Scholarship from the American Academy of Arts and Letters, and a Morton Gould Young Composer Award from ASCAP. He was also the winner of the 2011 Carsblad Music Festival Composers’ Competition and has been hailed by the New York Times as "richly talented" and by The New Yorker as a "maverick song composer."

Cooper is an associate professor at West Chester University and previously served on the faculty at Amherst College.

Works
Cooper's largest projects include Silver Threads, a song cycle for voice and electronic track released by Nonesuch Records, and Ripple the Sky, a work for voice and processed string octet commissioned by the Los Angeles Philharmonic Association. These works highlight Cooper's focus on slow development and the stretching of musical time. Many of Cooper's compositions involve live processing and electronics, and his interest in the digital realm extends to visual media: his video series Triptych was screened at the 2012 MATA Festival, and his piece Commencer une autre mort was shortlisted for the Guggenheim exhibit YouTube Play: A Biennial of Creative Video (2010).

Compositions and Projects 
Opera and Vocal-Theater

Threnos (for the Throat) (2017–20) for processed women's choir with electronic track
Timberbrit (2008, revised 2010) for male vocalist, female vocalist, guitar, keyboard, drumset, and laptop

Orchestral / large ensemble

Sanctus (2015) for orchestra and SATB choir
Serenade (2013) for 2 vocalists and 16 instrumentalists
Stabat Mater Dolorosa (2009) for string orchestra and 4 amplified voices
Odradek (2006) for full orchestra

Chamber

Terrain (2020) for 2 vocalists and cello
Air I and Air II (2016) for percussion quartet
Ripple the Sky (2016) for voice and string octet
Pasturing I and Pasturing II (2014) for guitar and percussion / drum set
Cast (2014) for chamber ensemble
Agitated, stumbling, like an endless run-on sentence (2011) for cl, bsn, tpt, tbn, perc, vln, db
bad black bottom kind (2011, rev. 2013) for string quartet
Cello Octet (2010)

Solo (and solo with electronic track / laptop)

Three pieces for Trombone and Trombone Track (2019)
Expiation (2018) for voice with electronic track
Ley Line (2016) for solo cello
Silver Threads (2011–13) song cycle for voice with electronic track
La Plus Que Plus Que Lente (2013) for piano with laptop
Arches (2012) for cello with laptop 
Clifton Gates (2011) for piano with laptop 
Alter Ad Alterum (2011) for accordion with laptop
Not Just Another Piece for Solo Bass Drum (2005)

Video

Triptych:
Commencer une autre mort (2010)
Black or White (2012)
Alla stagion dei fior (2012)

Recordings
Full albums

Terrain (New Amsterdam Records, 2020)
Silver Threads (Nonesuch Records, 2014) with Mellissa Hughes, soprano

Featured On

The String Orchestra of Brooklyn's afterimage (Furious Artisans, 2020), Stabat Mater Dolorosa
Ashley Bathgate's Ash (New Amsterdam Records, 2019), Ley Line
Eighth Blackbird's Hand Eye (Cedille Records, 2016), Cast
The Living Earth Show's Dance Music (New Amsterdam Records, 2016), Pasturing II 
Vicky Chow's A O R T A (New Amsterdam Records, 2016), Clifton Gates
Kathleen Supové's The Debussy Effect (New Focus Recordings, 2016), La plus que plus que lente

References

External links

Nonesuch Records artist page
WQXR Profile

Living people
Year of birth missing (living people)
American male classical composers
Place of birth missing (living people)
American classical composers
Yale School of Music alumni
Musicians from New York City
21st-century classical composers
Nonesuch Records artists
21st-century American composers
Amherst College alumni
West Chester University faculty
Classical musicians from New York (state)
21st-century American male musicians